Tunica County is a county located in the U.S. state of Mississippi. As of the 2020 census, the population was 9,782. Its county seat is Tunica. The county is named for the Tunica Native Americans. Most migrated to central Louisiana during the colonial period.

Tunica County is part of the Memphis, TN-MS-AR Metropolitan Statistical Area. It is located in the Mississippi Delta region.

Since the late 20th century, it is known for Tunica Resorts (formerly Robinsonville), an unincorporated community that is the site of six casino resorts. It is one of the top six destinations in the country in terms of gambling revenues.

Geography

Major highways
  Interstate 69
  U.S. Route 61
  Mississippi Highway 3
  Mississippi Highway 4

Adjacent counties

 Crittenden County, Arkansas (north)
 DeSoto County (northeast)
 Tate County (east)
 Panola County (southeast)
 Quitman County (south)
 Coahoma County (southwest)
 Phillips County, Arkansas (southwest)
 Lee County, Arkansas (west)

Demographics

2020 census

As of the 2020 United States Census, there were 9,782 people, 3,930 households, and 2,347 families residing in the county.

2010 census
As of the 2010 United States Census, there were 10,778 people living in the county. 73.5% were Black or African American, 23.7% White, 0.6% Asian, 0.1% Native American, 0.1% Pacific Islander, 1.2% of some other race and 0.9% of two or more races. 2.3% were Hispanic or Latino (of any race).

2000 census
As of the census of 2000, there were 9,227 people, 3,258 households, and 2,192 families living in the county.  The population density was 20 people per square mile (8/km2).  There were 3,705 housing units at an average density of 8 per square mile (3/km2).  The racial makeup of the county was 70.15% Black or African American, 27.54% White, 0.11% Native American, 0.42% Asian, 0.07% Pacific Islander, 0.96% from other races, and 0.75% from two or more races.  2.53% of the population were Hispanic or Latino of any race.

There were 3,258 households, out of which 33.30% had children under the age of 18 living with them, 33.90% were married couples living together, 26.90% had a female householder with no husband present, and 32.70% were non-families. 26.90% of all households were made up of individuals, and 9.90% had someone living alone who was 65 years of age or older.  The average household size was 2.80 and the average family size was 3.44.

In the county, the population was spread out, with 31.50% under the age of 18, 10.90% from 18 to 24, 27.40% from 25 to 44, 20.20% from 45 to 64, and 10.10% who were 65 years of age or older.  The median age was 31 years. For every 100 females there were 91.10 males.  For every 100 females age 18 and over, there were 85.90 males.

The median income for a household in the county was $23,270, and the median income for a family was $25,443. Males had a median income of $25,244 versus $18,104 for females. The per capita income for the county was $11,978.  About 28.10% of families and 33.10% of the population were below the poverty line, including 43.40% of those under age 18 and 32.50% of those age 65 or over.

Education
 Public School Districts
 Tunica County School District (the school district for the entire county)
 Private Schools
 Tunica Academy is located in an unincorporated area, near Tunica

Notable people 
 Brandon Bryant,  NFL player
 Parker Hall, 1939 Most Valuable Player of the National Football League
 Charlaine Harris, New York Times bestselling author
 Benardrick McKinney, linebacker for the New York giants of the National Football League
 James Cotton, blues harmonica player
 Donald Hawkins, NFL player

Communities

Town
 Tunica (county seat)

Census-designated places
 Austin
 Dundee
 North Tunica
 Tunica Resorts (formerly known as Robinsonville)
 White Oak

Unincorporated communities

 Banks
 Bowdre
 Clack
 Clayton
 Dubbs
 Evansville
 Hollywood
 Lost Lake
 Maud
 Mhoon Landing
 Prichard

Ghost towns
 Commerce
 Harbert Landing
 Penton
 Pink
 Trotter Landing

Politics

See also

National Register of Historic Places listings in Tunica County, Mississippi

References

External links
 Tunica County Sheriff

 
Mississippi counties
Counties in the Memphis metropolitan area
Mississippi placenames of Native American origin
Mississippi counties on the Mississippi River
1836 establishments in Mississippi
Populated places established in 1836
Black Belt (U.S. region)
Majority-minority counties in Mississippi